Nethercutt is a surname. Notable people with the surname include:

George Nethercutt (born 1944),  American politician, author, consultant, columnist, and commentator
Helen Nethercutt (born 1952), American businesswoman and autism activist
J.B. Nethercutt (1913–2004), American entrepreneur and car collector
Jack Nethercutt II (born 1936), American businessman and former professional racecar driver